Italy women's national roller hockey team is the national team side of Italy at international roller hockey.

Palmarès

Roster 2012
The last season of the women's national championship was held in 2007–2008, although this in July 2012 the national team returned to gather in view of new international competitions.

See also
Italy at the team sports international competitions
Italy men's national roller hockey team

References

External links
FIHP web site

 
I
European national roller hockey (quad) teams
Roller hockey